Wonopringgo is a village and subdistrict in Pekalongan Regency in Central Java, Indonesia. It is located south of Pekalongan. The village was an important centre of sugar production with the Karang Anjer Factory in the area during the Dutch East Indies from at least the 1830s when the first Chinese person ran the factory in Wonopringgo. The Amsterdam based Netherlands Trading Company (Nederlandsche Handelmaatschappij or NHM) operated in the village.

Administrative divisions
The subdistrict contains the following villages (desa/kelurahan) aside from Wonopringgo:

 Galang Pengampon Gede
 Getas
 Gondang
 Jetak Kidul
 Jetak Lengkong
 Kwagean
 Legok Gunung
 Pegaden Tengah
 Rowokembu
 Sampih
 Sastrodirjan
 Surabayan
 Wonorejo

References

Villages in Central Java
Districts of Central Java
Sugar production